Maardla is a village in Mustvee Parish, Jõgeva County in Estonia. Maardla has a population of 31 (as of 2011).

Actor Leonhard Merzin (1934–1990) was born in Aruküla village which is now part of Maardla village.

References

Villages in Jõgeva County